George Stephen Camacho (15 October 1945 – 2 October 2015) was a West Indian international cricketer who played in eleven Test matches from 1968 to 1971 as an opening batsman and occasional leg-spin bowler.

Camacho was part of the West Indian Test side for four series: 1967–68, 1968–69, 1969, 1970–71.  His final tour was to England in 1973: in only the second game, his cheekbone was fractured by a bouncer from Hampshire's Andy Roberts and he left the side, never to play another Test.

After retirement 
After retirement in 1979, Camacho served West Indies cricket as selector then secretary and later as chief executive of the West Indies Cricket Board. He was the author of a book Cricket at Bourda: Celebrating the Georgetown Cricket Club (. He died on 2 October 2015.

References

External links 
 

1945 births
2015 deaths
Sportspeople from Georgetown, Guyana
West Indies Test cricketers
Guyanese cricket administrators
Guyanese cricketers
Demerara cricketers
Guyana cricketers